Saint Mennas may refer to:

Ecumenical Patriarch Mennas of Constantinople, 6th-century patriarch of Constantinople
Saint Menas, 3rd-century Egyptian martyr